Eugnorisma pontica is a moth of the family Noctuidae. It is found in the Balkans and in parts of Near East and Middle East, including Israel.

Adults are on wing in October. There is one generation per year.

Larvae have been reared on various low growing plants.

External links
 Noctuinae of Israel

Eugnorisma
Moths of Europe
Moths of the Middle East
Moths described in 1892